E. macrophyllum may refer to:
 Erodium macrophyllum, synonym of California macrophylla, a flowering plant species native to the southwestern United States and northern Mexico
 Erythroxylum macrophyllum, a tropical tree species found in Costa Rica

See also